Moyencourt-lès-Poix (literally Moyencourt near Poix) is a commune in the Somme department in Hauts-de-France in northern France.

Geography
Not to be confused with another commune, Moyencourt, further east in the same département.

Population

See also
Communes of the Somme department

References

Communes of Somme (department)